Ninia maculata, the Pacific banded coffee snake or spotted coffee snake, is a species of snake in the family Colubridae.  The species is native to Guatemala, Honduras, Nicaragua, Costa Rica, and Panama.

References

Ninia
Snakes of Central America
Reptiles of Guatemala
Reptiles of Honduras
Reptiles of Nicaragua
Reptiles of Costa Rica
Reptiles of Panama
Reptiles described in 1940
Taxa named by Wilhelm Peters